The 1989–90 Belgian Hockey League season was the 70th season of the Belgian Hockey League, the top level of ice hockey in Belgium. Five teams participated in the league, and Olympia Heist op den Berg won the championship.

Regular season

Playoffs

External links
Season on hockeyarchives.info

Bel
Belgian Hockey League seasons
Bel